Jeetu Ahsan or Jitu Ahsan (born Syed Ashek Ali on 12 September 1977) is a Bangladeshi actor. The son of actor Syed Ahsan Ali, popularly known as Sydney, and educator Suraiya Ahsan, Ahsan made his acting debut as a child artist in Mustafizur Rahman's 'Ekti Shetur Golpo' (1982) in Bangladesh Television. As an adult, Ahsan professionally entered the acting arena with Abdullah Al Mamun's soap opera "Joar Bhata" in the year 2000. "Joar Bhata" was the first soap opera in the country in which Ahsan portrayed an anti-hero character and was immediately recognised as an upcoming talent. Throughout his career, Ahsan has ventured many anti-hero characters and received much applause. Esteemed Actor Humayun Faridee termed Ahsan as the best and the most talented of the contemporary actors. He received “RTV STAR AWARD” in 2014 as BEST ACTOR. He acted in a pivotal character of the highly acclaimed seven national award winner movie “Gohin Baluchor” in 2016. Among his notable works are “Shaola”, “Andhokarer Biruddhe”, “Jowar Bhata”, “Tobuo Protikkha”, “Nouka Dubi”, “Gohiney”, “Elebele”. He is also a member of "Aranyak Nattadal" in theater.

Early life and background 
Jeetu Ahsan was born on 12 September 1977 in Dhaka to legendary actor of Bengali drama and film, Syed Ahsan Ali and educator Suraiya Ahsan. Jeetu Ahsan's father Syed Ahsan Ali, popularly known as Sidney, was the first national award winning actor in Bangladesh Television (BTV). Ahsan's paternal grandfather was Syed Mohammed Ali, a Zamindar and his maternal grandfather was Moulovi Emdad Ali, a District Magistrate during British India.

Ahsan attended Sunbeams school, St. Joseph High School and Notre Dame College in Dhaka. He finished his undergraduate (BBA) and graduate (MBA) program from North South University , Dhaka.

Acting career

Child (1982–1994) 
Jeetu Ahsan entered the world of acting in 1982 as a child artist following the footsteps of his father, Syed Ahsan Ali Sydney.  His first drama was ‘Ekti Shetur Golpo’ broadcast on Bangladesh Television in 1982. From 1982 to 1994, Ahsan acted in 10 single episode dramas, one serial drama in Bangladesh Television (BTV) and one film titled Laal Balloon.

Professional expansion (2000–present) 
Ahsan got his professional breakthrough in Abdullah Al Mamun's first soap opera in the country “Joar Bhata” in the year 2000 sharing screen with big names such as Abdullah Al Mamun, Ferdousi Majumdar, Tareen , Shahiduzzaman Selim etc.  Ahsan played an anti-hero character in Joar Bhata. Ahsan's performance was widely appreciated and he started getting offers from big name production houses and directors such as Humayun Faridee, Afzal Hossain , Badrul Anam Saud, Suborna Mustafa, Nahid Ahmed Piyal, Mohon Khan, Akhter Ferdous Rana to name a few.

After his professional inception in the year 2000, Ahsan was extensively involved in soap operas, mega serials, telefilms and single episode dramas and has worked in all television channels.  Romantic, villainous, social , double roles , urban, rural Ahsan has ventured in multifaceted characters.  His acting skills gained him much appreciation, the media tagging him as a ‘Versatile’ actor. During his mother's ailment in 2018 and death in 2019, Ahsan worked in very few plays.

Film 
Ahsan made his debut on the silver screen with the film “Gohin Baluchor” directed by Badrul Anam Soud. Ahsan played the crucial antagonist role in the movie. The movie was highly acclaimed and went on to win seven national awards. Apart from Bangladesh, the movie was also released in USA and Canada. The film was highly appreciated among the Bengali communities abroad. Apart from ‘Gohin Baluchor’, Ahsan acted as a child artist in a short film titled “Laal Belloon” in 1984.

Personal life 
In family life, Ahsan married Taskina Islam in 2003 and together they have two children Syeda Adiba Ali and Syed Abrar Ali.

Awards 
For his role in the drama serial ‘Mayar Khela’ (2014),  Ahsan won the RTV Star Award for Best Actor.

Television appearances

Dramas, telefilms, serials and soap operas

Filmography

Awards and achievements

References

External links 
 
 

Bangladeshi male television actors
1977 births
Living people
21st-century Bangladeshi male actors